Braswell is a city in Polk and Paulding counties in the U.S. state of Georgia. As of the 2020 census, the city had a population of 355.

Geography
Braswell is located at  (33.983787, -84.959479).

History
Braswell had its start in 1882 when Southern Railway predecessor East Tennessee Virginia & Georgia Railroad was extended to that point. The ETV&G became part of Southern Railway when Southern Railway was incorporated in 1894.  Braswell was named for Henry S. Braswell (1832-1902), a prominent citizen of Paulding County who owned a large amount of land in the area.  Henry Braswell, in partnership with William McCracken, was in the land and timber business supplying crossties and bridge timbers to Southern Railway and Seaboard Air Line Railroad.  

Braswell was the location of the only tunnel on Southern Railway's (now Norfolk Southern Railway) Chattanooga to Atlanta main line. The original tunnel was bypassed in 1979 by cutting through Braswell mountain slightly to the east. Another nearby tunnel, the Brushy Mountain tunnel at Divide on the former route of the Seaboard Air Line Railroad, is currently used by bicyclists and joggers as a part of the Georgia/Alabama Silver Comet Trail. The portion of the trail in Alabama is the Chief Ladiga Trail, and the portion in Georgia is the Silver Comet Trail. 
The Silver Comet Trail was named for one of the Seaboard Air Line passenger trains, the Silver Comet, that traveled the route.

Demographics

2020 census

As of the 2020 United States census, there were 355 people, 131 households, and 89 families residing in the town.

References

External links
 Paulding County Historical Society & Museum

Cities in Georgia (U.S. state)
Cities in Paulding County, Georgia
Cities in Polk County, Georgia